Charles Cornwallis, 3rd Baron Cornwallis PC (28 December 1655 – 29 April 1698) was a British politician who served as First Lord of the Admiralty. He succeeded his father Charles Cornwallis, 2nd Baron Cornwallis as Baron Cornwallis in 1673. On 27 December that year, at Westminster Abbey, he married Elizabeth Fox (d. 28 February 1681 in Tunbridge Wells), daughter of Sir Stephen Fox. Their son Charles succeeded him as 4th Baron Cornwallis. After Elizabeth's death, he married Anne Scott, 1st Duchess of Buccleuch, widow of James Scott, 1st Duke of Monmouth.

References

1655 births
1698 deaths
17th-century English nobility
Lord-Lieutenants of Suffolk
Lords of the Admiralty
Members of the Privy Council of England
Charles
Barons Cornwallis